Athinhkaya Saw Yun (also spelled Sawyun;  1299 – 5 February 1327) was the founder of the Sagaing Kingdom of Myanmar (Burma). The eldest son of King Thihathu set up a rival kingdom in 1315 after Thihathu appointed Uzana I as heir-apparent. Saw Yun successfully resisted two small expeditions by Pinya by 1317. While Saw Yun nominally remained loyal to his father, he was the de facto king of the area roughly corresponding to present-day Sagaing Region and northern Mandalay Region.

After Thihathu's death, Sagaing and Pinya formally went separately ways. Saw Yun died in 1327. Saw Yun had four children, three sons and a daughter. All of his sons became king of Sagaing. His only daughter was the mother of Thado Minbya, the founder of the Kingdom of Ava.

Early life
Saw Yun was born to Thihathu, co-founder of Myinsaing Kingdom, and Yadanabon, daughter of the village head of Linyin,  1299. According to British colonial scholars, Saw Yun's mother was an ethnic Shan and his father half-Shan. But the royal chronicles do not mention his ethnicity at all. He grew up in Pinle, his father's capital alongside an elder step-brother Uzana, half younger brother Kyawswa, and a younger half-sister Saw Pale. The family moved to Pinya in 1313 when Thihathu became the sole ruler of the Kingdom of Myinsaing–Pinya.

Secession
Thihathu now officially considered himself the heir to Pagan kings. His chief queen was Mi Saw U, a daughter of Narathihapate. More importantly, he appointed his adopted son Uzana, the biological son of the fallen king Kyawswa and Mi Saw U, as his heir apparent. He also appointed Kyawswa, his first son by Mi Saw U, governor of Pinle.

The appointments did not go down well with Saw Yun, his eldest biological son by a commoner queen (Yadanabon). Saw Yun felt the throne was his. He agitated his father for a viceroyship in the north. While Thihathu wavered, on 15 May 1315, Saw Yun took matters in his own hand, and left for Sagaing with a group of followers, a few miles west of Pinya, across the Irrawaddy. Saw Yun found support in a sect of forest dwelling monks and their followers.

At first, Thihathu dismissed the 15-year-old's thinly veiled insurrection, and did not take any action. But Saw Yun continued to consolidate his support in the north, and fortified Sagaing with a brick wall, completed on 26 March 1316. Even then, Thihathu's response was halfhearted. He sent two small expeditions, each led by Uzana and Kyawswa respectively, to retake the city. Both attempts failed. Thihathu, who never liked rivals even with his own brothers, now decided to leave his eldest biological son alone. Saw Yun's position may also have been helped by an open rebellion in Toungoo (Taungoo) in 1317–18, and subsequent instabilities in Taungdwin. Thihathu got both Toungoo and Taungdwin under control but essentially ceded control of northern Upper Burma to Saw Yun. For his part, Saw Yun never formally renounced his allegiance to his father. Thihathu had to be satisfied with the arrangement although he must have known that Pinya and Sagaing would become bitter rivals after his death.

Reign
After Thihathu's death in 1325, the two kingdoms formally went separate ways, with Pinya controlling southern Upper Burma and Sagaing northern Upper Burma. (Zatadawbon Yazawin and Maha Yazawin chronicles count Saw Yun's official reign at Sagaing only after the death of Thihathu whereas later chronicles Yazawin Thit and Hmannan Yazawin count his reign from his first insurrection in 1315.) Early on, Pinya's new rulers still had designs on Sagaing. Pinya's attempt to assassinate Saw Yun nearly succeeded, stopped only by the assassin Khin Nyo's conscience at the last minute.

Saw Yun was remembered in Burmese chronicles as powerful, kindly and popular. He also contributed to Burmese military. In 1318, Saw Yun formed a cavalry regiment called Sagaing Htaungthin (lit. "Thousand-strong Regiment of Sagaing", although the numbers added up to only 830), which was maintained up till the fall of Burmese monarchy, and nine squadrons of cavalry.

He died  5 February 1327. He had four children by his chief queen Saw Hnaung: Soe Min, Kyaswa, Nawrahta Minye, and Tarabya II.

Historiography
The chronicles and inscriptional evidence show various dates with regard to his life.

Notes

References

Bibliography
 
 
 
 
 
 
 

Myinsaing dynasty
Pinya dynasty
Sagaing dynasty
1327 deaths
1299 births
14th-century Burmese monarchs